Penicillium corylophilum is a species of the genus of Penicillium which occurs in damp buildings in United States, Canada and western Europe but it can also be found in a variety of foods and mosquitoes. Penicillium corylophilum produces the alkaloid epoxyagroclavine and citrinin and is a pathogen to mosquitoes.

See also
List of Penicillium species

Further reading

References 

corylophilum
Fungi described in 1901